Arhopala atrax, the dark broken-band oakblue or Indian oakblue, is a species of lycaenid or blue butterfly found in the Indomalayan realm (India, Myanmar to Malaya).

Description

References

Arhopala
Butterflies of Asia
Taxa named by William Chapman Hewitson
Butterflies described in 1862